The Golden Melody Award for Best New Artist is an award given by the Ministry of Culture of Taiwan. It was first presented in 1990 as New Artist Award.

Winners and nominees

New Artist Award (1990–1996)

Best New Artist (1997–2003)

Popular music - Best Mandarin New Artist (2005)

Popular music - Best New Artist (2006)

Most Promising New Artist (2008)

Best New Artist (2009-present)

References

Golden Melody Awards